Ashleigh Barty was the defending champion, but she lost in the second round to Danielle Collins, in a rematch of the previous year's semifinal.

Iga Świątek won the title, defeating Belinda Bencic in the final, 6–2, 6–2. Świątek did not drop a set throughout the entire tournament.

Seeds
The top four seeds received a bye into the second round.

Draw

Finals

Top half

Bottom half

Qualifying

Seeds

Qualifiers

Lucky losers

Qualifying draw

First qualifier

Second qualifier

Third qualifier

Fourth qualifier

Fifth qualifier

Sixth qualifier

References

External links
 Main Draw
 Qualifying Draw

2021 WTA Tour
2021 Women's Singles
2021 in Australian tennis